Frederick Thornhill (25 September 1846 – 23 July 1876) was an English cricketer who played first-class cricket for Derbyshire in 1876.

Thornhill was born in Beeston, Nottinghamshire, the son of Richard Thornhill and his wife Eliza Reynolds and became an engine stoker for the Midland Railway. He took part in a cricket match playing for Birmingham in 1866. He made a single appearance for Derbyshire in the 1876 season, against Lancashire in June, when he mode no score in either innings.

Just over a month later, Thornhill died at the age of 29 at Toton Sidings, the largest marshalling yards of the Midland Railway.

Thornhill married Elizabeth Bywater in 1867.

References

1846 births
1876 deaths
English cricketers
Derbyshire cricketers
People from Beeston, Nottinghamshire
Cricketers from Nottinghamshire